Dutch Canadians are Canadians with full or partial Dutch ancestry. According to the Canada 2006 Census, there were 1,035,965 Canadians of Dutch descent, including those of full or partial ancestry. This increased to 1,111,655 in 2016.

History

The first Dutch people to come to Canada were Dutch Americans among the United Empire Loyalists. The largest wave was in the late nineteenth and early twentieth century when large numbers of Dutch helped settle the Canadian west. During this period significant numbers also settled in major cities like Toronto. While interrupted by the First World War this migration returned in the 1920s, but again halted during the Great Depression and Second World War. 

After World War II a large number of Dutch immigrants moved to Canada, including a number of war brides of the Canadian soldiers who liberated the Netherlands. There were officially 1,886 Dutch war brides to Canada, ranking second after British war brides.  During the war Canada had sheltered Crown Princess Juliana and her family. The annual Canadian Tulip Festival held in May commemorates her with a generous number of tulips coming from The Netherlands. Due to these close links Canada became a popular destination for Dutch immigrants. The Canadian government encouraged this, recruiting skilled workers. This post-war wave went mainly to urban centres such as Toronto, Ottawa, and Vancouver. With the economic recovery of the Netherlands in the post-war years immigration to Canada slowed.

While one of the largest minority groups in Canada, Dutch Canadians have tended to rapidly assimilate and there are relatively few Dutch Canadian organizations and media. One important institution is the Christian Reformed Church in North America, with most congregations found throughout Alberta, British Columbia, and Ontario. The Institute for Christian Studies in Toronto, The King's University in Edmonton, and Redeemer University College in Ancaster, Ontario are associated with this Dutch Reformed/Calvinist denomination. Christian Schools International, the Christian Labour Association of Canada, and the Christian Farmers Federation of Ontario are organizations with strong Dutch-Canadian roots.

Dutch Canadians, because of their shared cultural and religious heritage, tend to form tight-knit communities. This has led to an in-joke known as "Dutch bingo", where it is said that a Dutch Canadian is able to figure out his/her connection to another Dutch Canadian by asking questions about the other's last name, town of birth, church and the college they attended.

Geographical distribution 
Data from this section from Statistics Canada, 2021.

Provinces & territories

Notable people

Academia
Parzival Copes, economist
Sidney van den Bergh, astronomer
Madeleine Bonsma-Fisher, physicist

Arts and entertainment

Earl W. Bascom, actor, painter, sculptor
Neve Campbell, actress
Nicole de Boer, actress
Sarah de Leeuw, writer (Dutch descent)
Kristen Hager, actress
Ernest Hillen, journalist
Kristin Kreuk, actress
Cornelius Krieghoff, painter
J.J. McCullough, writer, cartoonist, political commentator and YouTuber. Mother is Dutch
Sigmund Brouwer, author, public speaker, athlete. Both his mother and father immigrated to Alberta from Holland following World War II. He won the gold medal for racquetball (doubles) at the Canada Winter Games in 1883 at the age of 22. 
Robert Naylor, actor
Michael Ondaatje, poet, novelist, editor and filmmaker
Patricia Rozema, writer, director
Hubert J. M. Schuh, sculpture, painter
Sonja Smits, actress (Dutch descent)
Cobie Smulders, actress
Jessica Steen, actress
Dorothy Stratten, model
Aritha Van Herk, writer
Laura Vandervoort, actress
Jeon Somi, singer and songwriter
Kevin Zegers, actor and model
Martin Kouprie, chef, author, cheesemaker

Business
William Cornelius Van Horne, president of CPR

Farming
Wiebo Ludwig

Politics and civil service

Michael Chong, Conservative MP, Wellington-Halton Hills
Roméo Dallaire, former Force Commander of UNAMIR peacekeeping force during the Rwandan genocide, former Liberal Senator, humanitarian
Stephen de Boer, Canada's Ambassador and Permanent Representative to the World Trade Organization in Geneva, Switzerland
Harry de Jong, Abbotsford, British Columbia Social Credit MLA from 1986 to 1994
Mike de Jong, Abbotsford, British Columbia Liberal MLA since 1994
Simon De Jong, former federal Saskatchewan NDP MP
Jacob De Witt, Member of the Legislative Assembly of Lower Canada, Member of the Legislative Assembly of the Province of Canada
Rick Dykstra, Conservative MP St. Catharines from 2006 to 2015 and Parliamentary Secretary
Fred Eisenberger, former Ward Alderman and Mayor of Hamilton, Ontario
John Gerretsen, former Mayor of Kingston, Ontario, former Ontario MPP and provincial cabinet minister
Samuel Holland, Royal Engineer and first Surveyor General of British North America
Eiling Kramer, the longest-serving member in the history of Saskatchewan's Legislative Assembly.
David Mathews, American Loyalist and former Mayor of New York City during the American Revolution who settled in Nova Scotia and became a leading administrator.
John Oostrom, first Dutch-born MP, Progressive Conservative for Willowdale
Case Ootes, former city councillor in Toronto; served as deputy mayor under Mayor Mel Lastman and represents one of the two Toronto—Danforth wards
Maximilien Polak, Quebec Liberal MNA for Saint-Anne from 1981 to 1989
Egerton Ryerson, Methodist minister, public education advocate, Chief Superintendent of Education for Upper Canada
Peter Stoffer, NDP MP Sackville-Eastern Shore from 1997 to 2015
Jacob Van Buskirk, Representative for Shelburne County in the Nova Scotia House of Assembly from 1805 to 1818
John van Dongen, Abbotsford, British Columbia Liberal MLA from 1995 to 2013
Anthony Van Egmond, Member of the Reform Movement in Upper Canada, a leader of the rebels in the Upper Canada Rebellion
Dave Van Kesteren, Conservative MP, Chatham-Kent-Leamington
Bill Vander Zalm, 28th Premier of British Columbia
Adam Swart Vedder, Westminster-Chilliwhack, British Columbia MLA from 1897 to 1898
Elizabeth Witmer, former Progressive Conservative MPP, Ontario cabinet minister and Chair of  Workplace Safety & Insurance Board of Ontario

Sports

Earl W. Bascom, rodeo pioneer, first rodeo champion inducted into Canada's Sports Hall of Fame, "father of modern rodeo"
Kyle Bekker, soccer player 
Ted-Jan Bloemen, Olympic speed skater, born in the Netherlands with a Canadian-born father
Jeff Beukeboom, retired NHL ice hockey player
Jay Bouwmeester, former NHL ice hockey player
Petra Burka, Olympic figure skater, Dutch born
Jason de Vos, retired professional soccer player
Greg de Vries, former NHL ice hockey player
Karl Dykhuis, ice hockey player; first cousin of Mark Brodwin, astrophysicist
Dan Hamhuis, former NHL ice hockey player
Harry Geris, wrestler
Bill Hogaboam, retired NHL player for the Minnesota North Stars and Detroit Red Wings
Ferdi Kadıoğlu, soccer player 
Slater Koekkoek, NHL player for the Edmonton Oilers
Trevor Linden, retired ice hockey player and former General Manager in the NHL for the Vancouver Canucks
Dwight Lodeweges, footballer, manager
Dirk Jan De Vries*, South African cricket player.
George Momberg, professional wrestler known by stage name "Killer Karl Krupp"
Matt Murray, NHL goaltender for the Toronto Maple Leafs
Jake Muzzin, defenseman for the Toronto Maple Leafs
Joe Nieuwendyk, former ice hockey player in the NHL, Hockey Hall of Fame member and former General Manager of the Dallas Stars
Beorn Nijenhuis, speed skater, who represents the Netherlands at the 2006 Winter Olympics
Pete Peeters, former NHL ice hockey player
Daniel Sprong, ice hockey player in the NHL for the Seattle Kraken
Eric Staal, ice hockey player in the NHL for the Florida Panthers
Jared Staal, ice hockey player formerly in the American Hockey League (AHL) for the Charlotte Checkers
Jordan Staal, ice hockey player in the NHL for the Carolina Hurricanes
Marc Staal, ice hockey player in the NHL for the Florida Panthers
Evert van Benthem, speed skater, won the Elfstedentocht in 1985 and 1986
Wayne Van Dorp, former ice hockey player in the NHL
Debbie Van Kiekebelt, track and field athlete
Adam van Koeverden, Olympic gold medallist in K-1 500 m; his last name relates him to the Dutch city of Coevorden
Lauren van Oosten, swimmer
John van 't Schip, footballer, manager currently serving Greece national football team
Ryan VandenBussche, former ice hockey player in the NHL
Kelly VanderBeek, alpine skier
David Van der Gulik, former ice hockey player in the NHL
Mike Vanderjagt, most accurate kicker in NFL history; played for the Indianapolis Colts and Dallas Cowboys
Jim Vandermeer, ice hockey player in the NHL
Pat Verbeek, former ice hockey player in the NHL
Tonya Verbeek, Sport wrestler, three time Olympic medallist
Kris Versteeg, retired NHL ice hockey player for the Chicago Blackhawks
Steve Yzerman, retired NHL player for the Detroit Red Wings
 Marcel De Jong

See also
 
 Canada–Netherlands relations
 Dutch Americans
 European Canadians

References

External links
Canadian Encyclopedia - Dutch
DCA: Dutch Canadian Association - Dutch Canadians
CAANS: Canadian Association for the Advancement of Netherlandic Studies - Dutch Canadians
Maandblad de Krant, monthly magazine for Canadians and Americans of Dutch Origin
DUTCH the magazine, about the Netherlands and its people, at home and abroad
Historical articles about postwar Dutch immigration to Canada and the USA

 
Canada
Dutch
Dutch